Everglades Holiday Park is an attraction park situated on 29 acres of wetlands in the Everglades in Fort Lauderdale, Florida. The park is located on the western end of Griffin Road, off U.S. 27. Everglades Holiday Park is not affiliated with Everglades National Park.

History 
George M. Bridges was a tobacco farmer with a background in construction. In 1982, he decided to pursue a new career and built his own airboat in the backyard. Mortgaging his house, Bridges invested all his money and time into building more airboats and starting an educational and recreational park ground. Bridges began offering narrated airboat tours through the Everglades and by June 1982, Everglades Holiday Park was officially operating. The park is family run, with George's son, Clint, overseeing the day-to-day operations.

The land now occupied by Everglades Holiday Park was originally owned by domestic profit corporation Davie Farm Lands, Inc and deeded to Broward County in 1964. The deed stipulated that the land's sole use be for "public recreation purposes." Broward County entered into a long-term lease agreement with the Florida Fish and Wildlife Conservation Commission (FWC) in 1965. The property was then subleased until June 2012 when the FWC returned the park to Broward County. It has since operated through the county's Parks and Recreation Division.

Attractions

Everglades Airboat Tours 
Everglades Holiday Park is one of many locations in Florida to offer airboat tours and rides. An airboat tour typically consists of a 45-60 minute guided experience, during which a captain can point out alligators and other wildlife in the Everglades. Airboat rides can reach speeds of up to 60 miles per hour.

Gator Boys Alligator Rescue 
Everglades Holiday Park is the home of the Gator Boys Alligator Rescue and educates the public about the ongoing conservation and preservation efforts in the Everglades. The team of gator trappers capture and rescue nuisance alligators from residential areas surrounding the Everglades and release them at the park. The park provides a protected habitat for gators which could otherwise be killed for their skin or meat. The rescue members are part of a TV show on Animal Planet called Gator Boys and film many of their episodes at the park.

Renovations 
In March 2022, Everglades Holiday Park unveiled the results of a major renovation project worth nearly $16 million. Many public areas were redesigned to help prevent chronic flooding. The project also included the addition of new restrooms, picnic areas, and public boat ramps.

References 

Amusement parks in Florida
Fort Lauderdale, Florida